Brazil's Department of Airspace Control (Departamento de Controle do Espaço Aéreo - DECEA) is a governmental military organization of the Aeronautics Command, which in turn is subordinated to the Ministry of Defense. Its mission  is to manage the operationality of the air traffic services on the Brazilian sovereign airspace, as well as to coordinate its defense along with COMDABRA (Comando de Defesa Aeroespacial Brasileiro: Brazilian Command of Airspace Defense).

External links
Official website

Government agencies of Brazil
Aviation organisations based in Brazil
Air traffic control
Air navigation service providers